Ashi Hi Banwa Banwi is a 1988 Indian Marathi-language comedy drama film directed by Sachin Pilgaonkar and produced by Kiran Shantaram. The film stars an ensemble cast of Sachin Pilgaonkar, Supriya Pilgaonkar, Ashok Saraf, Ashwini Bhave, Laxmikant Berde, Priya Arun, Siddharth Ray and Nivedita Saraf alongside Sudhir Joshi, Nayantara and Viju Khote. Remade in several other Indian languages, the film is considered as a cult classic comedy in Marathi cinema. Remake of Biwi Aur Makan (1966), the film revolves around four friends whose landlady insists only on having married couples as her tenants, so two of the friends are forced to pose as women and pretend to be the wives of the other two.

Plot 
Dhananjay Mane (Ashok Saraf) is a street-smart salesman in a cosmetic store in Pune and is in love with his employer Madhuri (Ashwini Bhave). He is the sole tenant of a stingy landlord Vishwas Sarpotdar (Sudhir Joshi), until he is joined by his younger brother Shantanu (Siddharth Ray) who is a medical student. This causes an irked Sarpotdar to charge an additional rent of Rs.35/-. Dhananjay's childhood friends Sudhir (Sachin Pilgaonkar) and Parshuram a.k.a. Parshya (Laxmikant Berde) live in Kolhapur who strive hard to make enough money for their daily life. 

Sudhir earns money by singing in village dances while Parshya works as a domestic helper for a drama contractor Chhaburao (Jairam Kulkarni). Soon, Sudhir's old uncle (Suhas Bhalekar) banishes him from his house due to his participation in village dances, while Chhaburao also fires Parshya from his job after learning about Parshya's affair with his daughter Kamli (Priya Arun). The duo travel to Pune and decides to live with Dhananjay and Shantanu, who keep them in the house secretly, or else they will have to pay more rent to Sarpotdar. 

However, Sudhir successfully gets a job of a music teacher and celebrates by going out to drink along with Dhananjay and Parshya. That night, the drunk trio accidentally enter Sarpotdar's house and end up insulting him harshly upon believing him to be Shantanu (having gone from their senses). They are taken away from the house by Shantanu who reaches the scene a little late. Enraged by this harassment, Sarpotdar angrily visits the quartet the next day and orders them to vacate the house in four days. 

After several unsuccessful attempts, the helpless Dhananjay and Shantanu come across the palatial house of a rich, old, kind and cataract-affected widow Leelabai Kalbhor (Nayantara) She lives with her shrewd servant Tanu (Gulab Korgaonkar) and is often harassed by her estranged nephew Bali (Viju Khote) for money. Also, Leelabai is willing to rent some rooms to married couples only to support her from both her cataract and Bali. 

Seeing no other way out, Dhananjay and Shantanu force Sudhir and Parshya to pose as females, and thus begins the comedy of errors. Parshya transforms himself into Dhananjay's wife "Parvati" while Sudhir transforms himself into Shantanu's wife "Sudha". 
The quartet then go to live as tenants in the house of Leelabai, who does not suspect a thing and is instantly convinced that "Parvati" and "Sudha" are the wives of Dhananjay and Shantanu, respectively. However, Tanu slowly begins to grow suspicious of them.

Shortly after the quartet's arrival, Leelabai's niece Manisha (Supriya Pilgaonkar) comes to stay at her house for 4-5 months along with her childhood friend Sushma (Nivedita Joshi), who is coincidentally Shantanu's girlfriend from Miraj and is distraught to see him married to "Sudha". However, Shantanu narrates her a fake story that "Sudha" has serious stomach cancer and that she would not live for more than six months. This provokes a regretful Sushma to be sympathetic towards Shantanu about his marriage with "Sudha".

Around the same time, Sudhir, having fallen in love with Manisha, meets her in is original form and lies to her that he is the twin brother of "Sudha", and that he disapproves of her marriage with Shantanu and is thus not talking terms with both "Sudha" and Shantanu. Manisha soon confesses her love for Sudhir and they decide to marry with Leelabai's consent. Also, Parshya secretly reunites with Kamli when she arrives in Pune with Chhaburao's drama troupe. 

One day, Bali tries to physically abuse "Parvati" on the streets to avenge his insult inflicted during his previous visit to Leelabai's house. However, Dhananjay arrives at the scene on time and chases Bali away. This prompts the quartet to stage the pregnancy of "Parvati", so that Parshya will be able to stay at home all the time, away from Bali. Soon, Madhuri visits Leelabai's house and is distraught to see Dhananjay married to "Parvati". Dhananjay confides the truth in Madhuri and they both confess their love for each other. 

Eventually, Tanu and Bali learn about the true identities of "Sudha" and "Parvati", after Tanu had noticed Parshya's wig and had even witnessed Sudhir jumping out from his window in his original form. Meanwhile, the quartet succeed in finding a new house with Madhuri's reference. In order to get out from Leelabai's residence, they stage that "Sudha" (on the conclusion of her terminal illness) is close to death and needs to be hospitalised immediately. 

While leaving from Leelabai's house, they are confronted by Bali and his goons and Bali exposes the quartet in front of Leelabai, Manisha and Sushma before handing them over to the police called in by Tanu. However, at the police station, Leelabai absolves them of their deception as she genuinely feels that they took advantage of her cataract and cheated on her only out of their need of a house, and that their intention was not to steal or cause any harm to her. 

Hence, Leelabai decides to take in the quartet as her sons and has the police drop all the charges against them. In the end, Bali is probably arrested and sent to prison for his crimes while Sudhir, Dhananjay, Parshya and Shantanu respectively get married to Manisha, Madhuri, Kamli and Sushma. The film ends with the four newlywed couples taking a family photograph with Leelabai.

Cast
The cast is listed below (according to the opening credits) -

 Sachin Pilgaonkar as Sudhir / Sudha Mane (fake) 
 Supriya Pilgaonkar as Manisha (Sudhir's love interest) 
 Ashok Saraf as Dhananjay Mane
 Ashwini Bhave as Madhuri (Dhananjay's love interest) 
 Laxmikant Berde as Parshuram a.k.a. Parshya / Parvati Mane (fake) 
 Priya Arun as Kamli (Parshya's love interest)
 Siddharth Ray as Shantanu Mane
 Nivedita Joshi as Sushma (Shantanu's love interest) 
 Sudhir Joshi as Vishwas Sarpotdar (landlord) 
 Suhas Bhalekar as Sudhir's uncle (Guest Appearance) 
 Bipin Varti as Police Inspector (Guest Appearance) 
 Jairam Kulkarni as Chhaburao (Kamli's father)
 Nayantara as Leelabai Kalbhor (landlady) 
 Gulab Korgaonkar as Tanu (Leelabai's servant) 
 Lata Thatte as Mrs. Sarpotdar (landlord's wife) 
 Viju Khote as Bali Kalbhor (Leelabai's nephew) 
 Madhu Apte as assistant of Sudhir's visitor (Guest Appearance)

Soundtrack
The lyrics were penned by Shantaram Nandgaonkar and Sudhir Moghe. The song Hridayi Vasant Phultana was sung by Anuradha Paudwal, Suresh Wadkar, Sudesh Bhosale, Uttara Kelkar, Shailendra Singh, Amit Kumar, Suhasini, Aparna Mayekar and Sachin Pilgaonkar.

Track listing

Remakes
 Chithram Bhallare Vichithram (1991) in Telugu 
 Olu Saar Bari Olu (2003) in Kannada
 Paying Guests (2009) in Hindi
 Mr & Mrs 420 (2014) in Punjabi
 Jio Pagla (2017) in Bengali

References

External links 
 

1980s Marathi-language films
Indian comedy films
Marathi films remade in other languages
Marathi remakes of Hindi films
1988 comedy films
1988 films
Films directed by Sachin (actor) 
 Indian buddy films
 1980s buddy films